The 2012 Men's Hockey Champions Challenge was held from 24 November to 2 December 2012 in Quilmes, Argentina. The tournament doubled as the qualifier to the 2014 Men's Hockey Champions Trophy to be held in India as the winner earned an automatic berth to compete.

Argentina won the tournament for the third time after defeating Korea 5–0 in the final, earning an automatic berth at the 2014 Men's Hockey Champions Trophy after their absence in the previous four editions.

Qualification
The following eight teams announced by the FIH competed in this tournament.

 (Host nation)
 (Eighth in 2011 Champions Trophy)
 (Winners of 2011 Champions Challenge II)
 (Third in 2011 Champions Challenge I)
 (Fifth in 2011 Champions Challenge I)
 (Sixth in 2011 Champions Challenge I)
 (Seventh in 2011 Champions Challenge I)
 (Eighth in 2011 Champions Challenge I)

Umpires
Below are the 10 umpires appointed by the International Hockey Federation:

 Geoff Conn
 Michael Eilmer
 Fernando Gómez
 Adam Kearns
 Satoshi Kondo
 Eduardo Lizana
 Javed Shaikh
 Aiden Shrives
 Gregory Uyttenhove
 You Suolong

Results
All times are Argentine Time (UTC−03:00)

First round

Pool A

Pool B

Second round

Quarterfinals

Fifth to eighth place classification

Crossover

Seventh and eighth place

Fifth and sixth place

First to fourth place classification

Semifinals

Third and fourth place

Final

Awards

Statistics

Final ranking

References

External links
Official FIH website

Men's Hockey Champions Challenge I
Champions Challenge I
Men's Hockey Champions Challenge I
International field hockey competitions hosted by Argentina